Incheon International Airport Cargo Terminal station or Airport Cargo Terminal is an underground station on the AREX. The station's name is derived from the cargo terminal of Incheon International Airport.

Station layout

References

External links 
 Airport Cargo Terminal station on private blog

Railway stations opened in 2007
Metro stations in Incheon
Jung District, Incheon
Seoul Metropolitan Subway stations